Max Meier (born 20 May 1936) is a Swiss boxer. He competed in the men's welterweight event at the 1960 Summer Olympics.

References

External links
 

1936 births
Living people
Swiss male boxers
Olympic boxers of Switzerland
Boxers at the 1960 Summer Olympics
Sportspeople from St. Gallen (city)
Welterweight boxers